Milford Hakin is the name of an electoral ward in Pembrokeshire, Wales. It covers the Hakin area of the Milford Haven community, to the west of Milford Haven Docks. It elects a councillor to Pembrokeshire County Council and three councillors to Milford Haven Town Council.

According to the 2011 UK Census the population of the ward was 2,239 (with 1,817 of voting age).

Prior to 1996 the ward for elections to Dyfed County Council was simply called Hakin.

County elections
At the May 2012 and May 2017 election the sitting Independent councillor Mike Stoddart successfully defended his seat. His wife Viv Stoddart won the neighbouring Milford Hubberston seat.

* = sitting councillor prior to the election

See also
 Milford Central
 Milford West
 List of electoral wards in Pembrokeshire

References

Pembrokeshire electoral wards
Milford Haven